Below is a list of all Anglican schools in Australia

Australian Capital Territory
 Canberra Girls Grammar School
 Canberra Grammar School
 Radford College
 Burgmann Anglican School

New South Wales

Queensland

Victoria

South Australia

Tasmania
 Launceston Church Grammar School
 St Michael's Collegiate School
 The Hutchins School

Western Australia

See also 

 Anglican education in Australia
 Lists of schools in Australia

External links 
 Anglican Schools Australia website

Anglican